Agios Sostis is a small village located at the borders of Arcadia, Elis and Messenia regional units, in southern Greece. It is part of the municipal unit Oichalia in Messenia. It lies at an altitude of  measured at the bridge and  measured at the upper part of the village.  Agios Sostis' history is closely related to the historical region of Gorena – the ancient city of Lykoa according to archaeologists - situated in the northwestern part of Mount Lykaion and next to the settlement of Tsouraki (a Turkish word for a small hut). Agios Sostis is mostly known for the church of Saint John (Agios Ioannis or Ayannis in Greek). The church is built on the ruins of a Byzantine monastery that the Franks destroyed in the 14th century. Excavations began after a vision seen by Yannis Constantopoulos. During these excavations, 60 cells, a golden tong, a chalice and a limestone cross were found. The neighboring villages contributed to the construction of the church and established an annual feast held at the August 29, attracting many visitors from nearby villages.

References 
"Mount Lykaion Throughout the Centuries", K. Potamianos, Edition of the Kotylion Association, Athens 2005
"Agios Sostis of Messinia", Andreas Kanellopoulos, Printing Shop Promitheas, Neo Iraklio 2006

Populated places in Messenia